The 1st-2nd Chasseurs Regiment was an armoured cavalry (tank) unit of the French Army. It was the armoured component of the 7th Armoured Brigade. Garrisoned at Quartier Maginot, Thierville-sur-Meuse near Verdun, France.

History
The Chief of Staff of the French Army decided on 1 September 1990 to create a new experimental armoured regiment of 80 tanks with two squadron groups (Groupes d’Escadrons, GE). Each group would consist of three combat squadrons and one command and logistics squadron.

The 1er-2e RCh was formed in 1998 by merging the 1st Chasseur Regiment and 2nd Chasseur Regiment as two squadron groups. 
The regiment was disbanded with the deactivation of the 2nd Chasseur Regiment. The 1st Chasseur Regiment continues in existence.

The regiment carried out operations in Lebanon, Kosovo, Bosnia, Afghanistan, Ivory Coast, Senegal and New Caledonia.

Organization
The regiment was composed of around 1200 personnel organization into 13 squadrons.

EAS - Administration and Support Squadron
1st Squadrons Group (x40 MBTs)
ECL - Command and Logistics Squadron
1e Esq - 1st Squadron
2e Esq - 2nd Squadron
3e Esq - 3rd Squadron
2nd Squadrons Group (x40 MBTs)
ECL - Command and Logistics Squadron
1e Esq - 1st Squadron
2e Esq - 2nd Squadron
3e Esq - 3rd Squadron
EEI - Reconnaissance Squadron
EMR - Regimental Maintenance Squadron
5e Esq (UIR) - 5th Squadron (Reserve response unit)
6e Esq (UIR) - 6th Squadron (Reserve response unit)

Commanding officers
Colonel Le Jariel des Châtelets (1995–1997)
Colonel Bertrand Binnenjdick (1997–1999)
Colonel Hervé Faivre d'Arcier (1999–2001)
Colonel Manuel Salazar (2001–2003)
Colonel Luc Beaussant (2003–2005)
Colonel Jean-dominique Dulière (2005–2007)
Colonel Nicolas Casanova (2007–2009)

References

Armoured regiments of France
21st-century regiments of France
Military units and formations established in 1998
Military units and formations disestablished in 2009